The Chendur Express is an Express train operated by Southern Railway zone of Indian railways. This train runs between Thiruchendur and Chennai Egmore. It is a daily overnight service and an important train of Tiruchendur–Tirunelveli line. It is one of the fastest trains in this region.

Route and halts 
This train is being operated via the main line and hauled by an electric locomotive from Chennai Egmore to Tirunelveli and a diesel locomotive from Tirunelveli to Tiruchendur (currently under electrification).

Schedule

Coach composition
The Chendur Express between Egmore and Tiruchendur has a rake sharing agreement with Mannai Express between Chennai and Mannargudi. These two rakes are used for operating Mannargudi – Mayiladuthurai – Mannargudi and Tiruchendur – Tirunelveli – Tiruchendur passenger trains.

It has one AC First Class cum IInd Class, one Ac Two Tier, one AC Three Tier, nine Sleeper class, four Unreserved general sitting coach.

See also
Tiruchirappalli–Tirunelveli Intercity Express
Nellai Superfast Express
Pearl City (Muthunagar) Superfast Express
Pothigai Superfast Express

References

External links
Indian Railway official website

Named passenger trains of India
Rail transport in Tamil Nadu
Express trains in India